Jatun Qaqa (Quechua jatun, hatun big, qaqa rock, "big rock", also spelled Jatun Khakha) is a mountain in the Bolivian Andes which reaches a height of approximately . It is located in the Potosí Department, Tomás Frías Province, Yocalla Municipality. It lies between Wayra Wasi in the east and Jatun Q'asa in the west.

References 

Mountains of Potosí Department